Ilhéu Raso is an uninhabited  volcanic island in the Barlavento archipelago of Cape Verde. Together with Santa Luzia and Ilhéu Branco, Ilhéu Raso is on the tentative list of UNESCO's World Heritage Sites. Since 1990, the islet is part of the protected area Reserva Natural Integral de Santa Luzia.

The south-western part is a dry, boulder-strewn plain. There is little vegetation apart from an area of grassland in the south-west. The entire coastline consists of rocky cliffs.

Fauna
Raso is now the only home of the critically endangered Raso lark (about 45 pairs). The island has been identified as an Important Bird Area (IBA) by BirdLife International because, as well as the larks, it supports populations of Cape Verde shearwaters (with an estimated 2500–3750 breeding pairs), red-billed tropicbirds (25–40 pairs), Cape Verde barn owls and Iago sparrows, others include Oceanodroma castro. It is one of only two islands where the extinct Cape Verde giant skink has been recorded. The giant wall gecko (Tarentola gigas) and a skink (Mabuya stangeri) still occur.

References

External links

Fauna and flora of Cape Verde
Ilhéu Raso (BirdLife International)
« Étude de cas : Ilhéu Raso » (Biosfera I) 

Uninhabited islands of Cape Verde
Important Bird Areas of Cape Verde